The 2022 season was São Paulo's 93rd season in the club's history and their 62nd in the top-flight of Brazilian football. Along with Série A, São Paulo was compete in the Campeonato Paulista, Copa do Brasil and Copa Sudamericana.

First-team squad

Youth players with first team numbers

Other players under contract

Out on loan

Retired numbers 
 01 –  Rogério Ceni, Goalkeeper (1990–2015)

Transfers

Transfers in

Loans in

Transfers out

Loans out

Statistics

Overall
{|class="wikitable"
|-
|Games played || 77 (16 Campeonato Paulista, 10 Copa do Brasil, 13 Copa Sudamericana, 38 Campeonato Brasileiro)
|-
|Games won || 36 (10 Campeonato Paulista, 4 Copa do Brasil, 9 Copa Sudamericana, 13 Campeonato Brasileiro)
|-
|Games drawn || 21 (2 Campeonato Paulista, 3 Copa do Brasil, 1 Copa Sudamericana, 15 Campeonato Brasileiro)
|-
|Games lost || 20 (4 Campeonato Paulista, 3 Copa do Brasil, 3 Copa Sudamericana, 10 Campeonato Brasileiro)
|-
|Goals scored || 119
|-
|Goals conceded || 82
|-
|Goal difference || +37
|-
|Best results  || 4–0 (H) v Athletico Paranaense - Campeonato Brasileiro - 2022.04.10 4–0 (H) v Avaí - Campeonato Brasileiro - 2022.09.25 4–0 (A) v Goiás - Campeonato Brasileiro - 2022.11.13
|-
|Worst result || 0–4 (A) v Palmeiras - Campeonato Paulista - 2022.04.03
|-
|Top scorer || Jonathan Calleri (27 goals)
|-

Goalscorers

Managers performance

Competitions

Overview

Campeonato Paulista

Matches

Quarter-final

Semi-final

Finals

Copa Sudamericana

The draw for the group stage was held on 25 March 2022, 12:00 PYST (UTC−4), at the CONMEBOL Convention Centre in Luque, Paraguay.

Round of 16 

The draw for the round of 16 was held on 27 May 2022, 12:00 PYST (UTC−4), at the CONMEBOL Convention Centre in Luque, Paraguay.

Quarter-finals

Semi-finals

Final

Série A

League table

Results summary

Results by round

Matches
The league fixtures were announced on 2 February 2022.

Copa do Brasil

First round

Second round

Third round

Round of 16

Quarter-finals

Semi-finals

References

External links

São Paulo FC seasons
São Paulo FC